The South African Civil Aviation Authority (SACAA or CAA) is the civil aviation authority of South Africa, overseeing civil aviation and governing investigations of aviation accidents and incidents. It is headquartered in the Ikhaya Lokundiza Building 16 in Waterfall Park, Midrand, near Johannesburg.

See also

 Railway Safety Regulator

References

External links
 South African Civil Aviation Authority

Organizations investigating aviation accidents and incidents
Organisations based in Johannesburg
Aviation organisations based in South Africa
Government agencies of South Africa
South Africa
Civil aviation in South Africa